Are We There is the fourth studio album by the American singer-songwriter Sharon Van Etten. It was released on May 27, 2014 via Jagjaguwar.

Packaging
Of the lack of a question mark in the album's title, Van Etten said it was "… open-ended, I ask myself that question all the time, for my work, for my love, even for my friends. It's just really good to check in with yourself and it's a play on words, about touring and about travelling, being in transition."

Reception

Upon its release Are We There received widespread critical acclaim. At Metacritic, which assigns a normalized rating out of 100 to reviews from mainstream publications, the album received an average score of 86, based on 36 reviews, indicating "universal acclaim". Fred Thomas of AllMusic rated Are We There four-out-of-five stars, in particular praising the album's "inventive arrangements and advances in songwriting", which he referred to as "an undeniable step forward for Van Etten". In Rolling Stone, Will Hermes also rated Are We There four-out-of-five stars, writing that "like Nick Cave, [Van Etten's] darkness contains multitudes" and calling the album "magnificent" and one "which grows her trademark examinations of romantic decay to cathedral-like scale." The A.V. Clubs Emily VanDerWerff summarised that "Are We There offers an artist in full command of her voice and her instrument" and called it a "punishing epic of an album, intense and bruised and haunted", ultimately awarding it an A− rating.

Pitchfork writer Stephen M. Deusner called Are We There "the peak of a steady upward trajectory", describing how it was more "self-determined and self-directed" than Van Etten's previous albums, Because I Was in Love (2009), Epic (2010) and Tramp (2012). In NME, Cian Traynor made a similar observation, writing that Are We There is "less jagged and more finessed than its intricately layered predecessor … The songs are slower and spacious enough to keep their clarity intact". Traynor further praised the album's arrangements and Van Etten's emotional delivery, awarding it an eight-out-of-ten rating. However, writing for The Guardian, Tim Jonze offered a more mixed review  criticizing how Van Etten's songwriting on Are We There "conforms to accomplished but trad indie-rock norm". Jonze did, however, appreciate the album's "unusual harmonies", "orchestral slow build" and referred to "Every Time the Sun Comes Up" as a "stirring closing number" in his three-out-of-five-star review.

Accolades
Due to its high rating of 86 on Metacritic, Are We There became the fifth-most critically acclaimed album of 2014. In addition, it placed in several year-end lists. The album was placed at number 20 on Rolling Stones list of the "50 Best Albums of 2014." Likewise, NME placed the album at number 31 on their list, while Q placed it at number 7. Jessica Goodman and Ryan Kistobak of The Huffington Post included the album on their list of 2014's best releases, calling the album "earnest and tragic". In 2019, Pitchfork ranked Are We There at number 174 on their list of "The 200 Best Albums of the 2010s"; contributing editor Jayson Greene wrote: "Are We There was a great deepening—of Sharon Van Etten’s emotional range, of the power of her songwriting, and of the potency of her voice."

Track listing

Personnel
All personnel credits adapted from Are We Theres album notes.

Musicians
Sharon Van Etten – vocals , guitar , piano , organ , Omnichord , bass , drums , synthesizer , claps 
David Hartley – bass , bass synthesizer , baritone guitar , guitar , backing vocals , claps 
Zeke Hutchins – drums , percussion , backing vocals , claps 
Heather Woods Broderick – strings , backing vocals , electric piano 
Jonathan Meiburg – guitar , organ , electric piano 
Jacob C. Morris – electric piano , organ , piano 
Doug Keith – guitar , bowed guitar 
Adam Granduciel – guitar , electric piano 
Stewart Lerman – piano , organ 
Stuart Bogie – woodwinds 
Mickey Free – beats 
Mackenzie Scott – backing vocals 

Musicians (continued)
Mary Lattimore – harp 
Marisa Anderson – guitar 
Peter Broderick – strings 
Jana Hunter – backing vocals 
Little Isidore – backing vocals 

Technical personnel
Sharon Van Etten – production
Stewart Lerman – production, mixing 
James Frazee – recording
Richard Swift – mixing 

Design personnel
Martine Franck – photography
Dusdin Condren – photography

Charts

References

External links

2014 albums
Albums produced by Stewart Lerman
Jagjaguwar albums
Sharon Van Etten albums